Jennifer Capriati was the defending champion, but did not compete this year.

Julie Halard won the title by defeating Amanda Coetzer 7–5, 7–5 in the final.

Seeds

Draw

Finals

Top half

Bottom half

References

External links
 Official results archive (ITF)
 Official results archive (WTA)

Puerto Rico Open (tennis)
1991 WTA Tour